The men's single sculls competition at the 2000 Summer Olympics in Sydney, Australia took place at the Sydney International Regatta Centre. It was held from 17 to 23 September. There were 24 competitors from 24 nations, with each nation limited to a single boat in the event. The event was won by Rob Waddell of New Zealand, the nation's first victory in the event after bronze medals in 1920 and 1988. Defending champion Xeno Müller of Switzerland placed second, becoming the 11th man to win multiple medals in the event. Marcel Hacker of Germany took bronze; it was the 11th consecutive Games with a German rower on the podium in the event (including the United Team of Germany, East Germany, West Germany, and Germany).

Background

This was the 23rd appearance of the event. Rowing had been on the programme in 1896 but was cancelled due to bad weather. The single sculls has been held every time that rowing has been contested, beginning in 1900.

Seven of the 21 single scullers from the 1996 Games returned: gold medallist Xeno Müller of Switzerland, silver medallist Derek Porter of Canada, fifth-place finisher (and 1992 silver medallist) Václav Chalupa of the Czech Republic, seventh-place finisher Rob Waddell of New Zealand, eighth-place finisher Ali Ibrahim of Egypt, twelfth-place finisher Sergio Fernández González of Argentina, and eighteenth-place finisher (and 1992 fifth-place finisher) Jüri Jaanson of Estonia. Müller and Waddell were the top two scullers coming into the Games; Waddell had won the last two World Championships in 1998 and 1999 with Müller the runner-up both times. Porter was another contender, with a third-place finish at the latest World Championship (he had also won that event seven years earlier). Chalupa was also a perennial contender, with four silver and two bronze medals at the World Championships in the single sculls to go along with his 1992 Olympic silver (he would add a third bronze in 2001). Other challengers included veterans Jaanson and Fernández. 

Algeria, Kazakhstan, Pakistan, Slovakia, and Tunisia each made their debut in the event. The United States made its 19th appearance, most among nations.

Competition format

This rowing event is a single scull event, meaning that each boat is propelled by a single rower. The "scull" portion means that the rower uses two oars, one on each side of the boat; this contrasts with sweep rowing in which each rower has one oar and rows on only one side (not feasible for singles events). The competition consists of multiple rounds. Finals were held to determine the placing of each boat; these finals were given letters with those nearer to the beginning of the alphabet meaning a better ranking. Semifinals were named based on which finals they fed, with each semifinal having two possible finals. The course used the 2000 metres distance that became the Olympic standard in 1912. 

During the first round four quarterfinal heats, each with 6 boats, were held. The winning boat in each heat advanced to the semifinals, while all others were relegated to the repechages.

The repechages offered the rowers a chance to qualify for the semi-final. Placing in the repechages determined which semifinal the boat would race in. Four heats were held, with 5 boats each. The top two boats in each repechage moved on to the A/B semifinals, with the bottom three boats going to the C/D semifinals.

Four semifinals were held, two each of A/B semifinals and C/D semifinals. For each semifinal race, the top three boats moved on to the better of the two finals, while the bottom three boats went to the lesser of the two finals possible. For example, a second-place finish in an A/B semifinal would result in advancement to the A final.

The fourth and final round was the finals. Each final determined a set of rankings. The A final determined the medals, along with the rest of the places through 6th. The B final gave rankings from 7th to 12th, the C from 13th to 18th, and so on. Thus, to win a medal rowers had to finish in either the top one of their quarterfinal or top two of their repechage heat and top three of their A/B semifinal to reach the A final.

Schedule

All times are Australian Time (UTC+10)

Results

Quarterfinals

The winner of each heat advanced to the A/B semifinals, remainder went to the repechage.

Quarterfinal 1

Quarterfinal 2

Quarterfinal 3

Quarterfinal 4

Repechage

The first two in each heat qualified for semifinals A/B, with the remainder going to semifinals C/D.

Repechage heat 1

Repechage heat 2

Repechage heat 3

Repechage heat 4

Semifinals

The semifinals were held on 21 September 2000. For the C/D semifinals, the first three in each heat qualified for Final C, with the remainder going to Final D. Similarly, for the A/B semifinals, the top three went to Final A and the bottom three to Final B.

Semifinal C/D 1

Semifinal C/D 2

Semifinal A/B 1

Semifinal A/B 2

Finals

Final D

Final C

Final B

Final A

Results summary

References

External links
Official Report of the 2000 Sydney Summer Olympics
Rowing Results

Rowing at the 2000 Summer Olympics
Men's events at the 2000 Summer Olympics